St. Patrick's High School, located in Ottawa, Ontario, Canada, is a Catholic high school publicly funded under the Ontario school system as part of the Ottawa Catholic School Board. It was founded in 1929 by the Missionary Oblates of Mary Immaculate.

History
In 1929, St. Patrick's College High School 135 students and 7 teachers were housed in St. Joseph Parish Hall, a two-storey, red brick hall on Laurier Avenue East in Ottawa. St. Patrick's High School has had a crest and motto since its founding in 1929. The school logo includes the name of the school, St. Patrick's High School, and the motto “Religio Alit Artes.” The armorial bearings of St. Patrick's High School in Ottawa was “entered in the Public Register of Arms, Flags and Badges of Canada” and presented to the school on Wednesday, March 6, 2002.

In 1930, St. Patrick's College High School moved to join the new St. Patrick's College at a joint campus of 392 students and a faculty of 22 facing Echo Drive and the Rideau Canal. The Echo Drive facility housed the school for almost four decades. Masses were held in the college chapel until the church was built in 1931. From 1930- 1964, St. Patrick's College High School took in boarders from the Ottawa Valley area as well as from farther afield.

The Patrician, the first St. Patrick's High School newspaper, was published in 1934.

The Oblates’ active involvement in the administration of the school from 1929 came to an end in 1973. The names of 155 Oblates of Mary Immaculate in St. Peter's Province, who taught at St. Patrick's High School during the period 1929-1973 are engraved on a plaque that was mounted on an Oblate cross and presented to the students and staff of St. Patrick's High School on March 17, 1986.

The school was renamed St. Jude's Junior High School for the 1972–73 school year. In 1973, the school was renamed St. Patrick's Junior High School because the higher grades were no longer accommodated. The school was renamed St. Patrick's High School, a full-fledged secondary school in 1986. St. Patrick's High School remained at the 1485 Heron Road site until 1993, when it moved to 2525 Alta Vista Drive, then the location of École Secondaire Charlebois of the French Public School Board. During the 1993-94 school year, the building was shared by the two schools, after which Charlebois was closed and students transferred to other schools including De La Salle.

86 former students of St. Patrick's were killed in World War II.

In 1968 St. Patrick's College became affiliated with Carleton University. St. Patrick's College High School relocated to the Campanile Campus at 1485 Heron Road, where St. Patrick's shared the location with Notre Dame High School, run by the Sisters of the Congregation of Notre Dame. In 1968, the school change its name from St. Patrick's College High School to St. Patrick's High School.

Athletics 
The St Pat's Irish play in the NCSSAA (National Capital Secondary Schools Athletic Association).

In September 1989, the “St. Pat’s Fighting Irish” hit the field for the first time since 1975, defeating Laurentian High School in the process. The school celebrated its 75th anniversary in 2004. To mark the occasion, a video was produced by Roy
Ketcheson.

Student Body

The student dress code at St. Patrick's High School consists of black dress pants, white dress shirt or polo shirt with the St. Patrick's name, green plaid kilt or black skirt, green sweat shirt with plaid letter “P,” green cardigan or pullover with St. Patrick's crest, green blazer with St. Pat's crest, green rugby shirt with St. Pat's and the letter “P.”  St. Patrick's student ambassadors, who are senior students, wear green blazers with the school crest.

Principals
Albert Meereboer, O.M.I. (1929–30)
J. Harold Conway, O.M.I. (1947–63)
Frank Kavanaugh, O.M.I. (1964–69)
Carl Kelly, O.M.I. (1969–72)
Frank Kavanaugh, O.M.I. (1972–73) (as St. Jude's Junior High School)
John Knobel (1973–76) (as St. Patrick's Junior High School)
Robert Kendall (1976–83)
Michael Nolan (1983–84)
Georges Bouliane (1984–85)
Sister Anna Clare Berrigan (1985–86) and (1986-89 at St. Patrick's High School)
Walter Hempey (1989–93) and (1993-96 at St. Patrick's High School on Alta Vista Drive)
John Shaughnessy (1996-2000)
Joseph Mullally (2000–05)
Ronald Chisholm (2005-2010)
Brid Mcdonald (2012-2017)
Carrie Bowie (2017- 2021 )
Marline Al Koura (2021-Present)

Notable alumni

 Dan Aykroyd, Actor
 Christo Bilukidi, NFL player
 Ernie Calcutt (1932–1984), radio sports commentator and broadcaster for the Ottawa Rough Riders
 Robert Chiarelli, First Mayor of the Regional Municipality of Ottawa-Carleton (2001–2006)
 Neville Gallimore, NFL player
 Wilbert Keon, Senator, founder of the Ottawa Heart Institute and officer of the Order of Canada
 Jim Kyte, professional hockey player for the Ottawa Senators, first deaf player in the NHL
 Ali Mahmoud, basketball player for the Lebanon national basketball team who took part in World Basketball Championships in 2006 and 2010
 Pat Marsden (1936-2006), longtime CTV sportscaster; weeknight sports anchor, CFTO-TV Toronto
 Dalton McGuinty, Premier of Ontario and leader of the Ontario Liberal Party (1996–2012)
 Maureen McTeer, Author and wife of former Prime Minister, Joe Clark
 Marial Shayok, 54th pick of the 2019 NBA Draft, the first NBA pick ever from Ottawa
 The Right Honorable John Turner, 17th Prime Minister of Canada
 Valdy (Valdemar Horsdal), Juno Award winning folk artist
 Michael O'Brien, author
 Jesse Luketa, NFL Player

See also
List of high schools in Ontario

References

150 years of Catholic Education in Ottawa-Carleton 1856-2006, Ottawa-Carleton Catholic School Board, 2006

External links

 Official website
 Official School Profile
 Official Coat of Arms

High schools in Ottawa
Educational institutions established in 1929
Catholic secondary schools in Ontario
1929 establishments in Ontario